Francisco Caro  (1627 – 1667) was a Spanish Baroque painter.

Life
He received his  initial artistic education from his father, but later went to Madrid, where he studied under of Alonso Cano. According to Antonio Palomino his most important l works were the Life of the Virgin, in the chapel of San Isidoro in the church of St. Andrew, and the celebrated Porciuncula, for the church of San Francisco at Segovia, now in the collection of the Prado in Madrid.

He died at Madrid in 1667.

References

Attribution:
 

1627 births
1667 deaths
17th-century Spanish painters
Spanish male painters
Painters from Seville
Spanish Baroque painters